Lord Haliburton of Dirleton (or Dirletoun) was a Scottish Lordship of Parliament created circa. 1450 for Sir Walter de Haliburton, Lord High Treasurer of Scotland. The seat of Lord Haliburton was at Dirleton Castle in present-day East Lothian.

The last Haliburton of Direleton was Patrick, 6th Lord Haliburton, died c. 1506. His three daughters with Christine Wawane, Janet, Margaret and Mariotta were his heirs. Janet married William Ruthven, 2nd Lord Ruthven in 1515, who subsequently gained the Dirleton lordship.

Lords Haliburton of Dirleton
Walter de Haliburton, 1st Lord Haliburton of Dirleton (died c. 1447)
John Haliburton, 2nd Lord Haliburton of Dirleton (died c. 1452–1454)
Patrick Haliburton, 3rd Lord Haliburton of Dirleton (died c. 1459)
George Haliburton, 4th Lord Haliburton of Dirleton (died c. 1492)
James Haliburton, 5th Lord Haliburton of Dirleton (died c. 1502)
Patrick Haliburton, 6th Lord Haliburton of Dirleton (died c. 1506)
Janet Haliburton, 7th Lady Haliburton of Dirleton (died c. 1560)
de jure uxoris William Ruthven, Lord Ruthven and Dirleton
Patrick Ruthven, 8th Lord Dirleton
William Ruthven, 9th Lord Dirleton, attainted and executed 1584

References

The Scots Peerage IX vols, Balfour Paul, Sir James, Edinburgh 1904

 
Forfeited lordships of Parliament
Noble titles created in 1449